NA-208 Nawabshah-II is a constituency for the National Assembly of Pakistan.

Election 2002 

General elections were held on 10 Oct 2002. Azra Fazal  of PPP won by 60,267 votes.

Election 2008 

General elections were held on 18 Feb 2008. Syed Ghulam Mustafa Shah of PPP won by 81,194 votes.

Election 2013 

General elections were held on 11 May 2013. Syed Ghulam Mustafa Shah of PPP won by 135,502 votes and became the  member of National Assembly.

Election 2018 

General elections are scheduled to be held on 25 July 2018.

See also
NA-207 Nawabshah-I
NA-209 Sanghar-I

References

External links 
Election result's official website

NA-214